The 1970 Swedish speedway season was the 1970 season of motorcycle speedway in Sweden.

Individual

Individual Championship
The 1970 Swedish Individual Speedway Championship final was held on 26 September in Stockholm. Ove Fundin won the Swedish Championship for the ninth time.

Junior Championship
 
Winner - Tommy Jansson

Team

Team Championship
Kaparna  won division 1 and were declared the winners of the Swedish Speedway Team Championship for the second time. The team included Ove Fundin, Göte Nordin and Bengt Jansson

Bysarna won the second division, while Filbyterna and Vikingarna won the third division east and west respectively.

See also 
 Speedway in Sweden

References

Speedway leagues
Professional sports leagues in Sweden
Swedish
Seasons in Swedish speedway